The Women's 800m race for class T12 visually impaired athletes at the 2004 Summer Paralympics were held in the Athens Olympic Stadium. The event consisted of 2 heats and a final, and was won by Assia El Hannouni, representing .

1st round

Heat 1
20 Sept. 2004, 09:45

Heat 2
20 Sept. 2004, 09:55

Final round

22 Sept. 2004, 18:40

References

W
2004 in women's athletics